Cliff Lake is located in the  Northwest Piscataquis unorganized territory and North Maine Woods region, within Piscataquis County in northern Maine.

The lake drains via Twin Lake and South Twin Brook into Churchill Lake, the source of the Allagash River.

It is home to many species of cold water fish.

Notes 

Lakes of Piscataquis County, Maine
Allagash River
North Maine Woods
Lakes of Maine